DWBS is the callsign of the following radio stations in the Philippines
 DWBS-AM, 1008 kHz, in Albay
 DWBS-FM, 88.7 MHz, in Sorsogon